Ouélessébougou  is a town and rural commune in the Cercle of Kati in the Koulikoro Region of south-western Mali. The commune covers an area of approximately 1,118 square kilometers and includes the town of Ouélessébougou and 44 villages. In the 2009 census the commune had a population of 50,056. The town lies 80 km south of Bamako on the Route Nationale 7.

See also 
 List of cities in Mali

References

External links

Official website of Ouélessébougou
.

Communes of Koulikoro Region